The Minnesota Japanese School (MNJS; ミネソタ日本語補習授業校 Minnesota Nihongo Hoshū Jugyō Kō) is a supplementary Japanese school for the children of Japanese citizens residing in Minnesota.  The school was founded in 1978  and offers classes from pre-k to high school. Classes are held on Saturdays on the campus of Valley View Middle School, located in Edina, Minnesota, just south of Minneapolis.

The Minnesota Japanese School is recognized by the Japanese Ministry of Education, Culture, Sports, Science and Technology (MEXT) as teaching a curriculum equivalent to that of schools in Japan for children of similar age.

History
It opened in the late 1970s/early 1980s, with classes first held in St. Louis Park. It was formerly held at the Anoka-Ramsey Community College in Coon Rapids, with the school using a total of eleven of that campus's classrooms. Later classes were held at Normandale Community College in Bloomington.

Initially the school only catered to pupils who were going to go back to Japan, but later the school began catering to permanent residents of the United States.

Curriculum
The school focuses on Japanese language and mathematics. In the 1980s Japanese students perceived the school as having more intense coursework, lasting into the summer, compared to the American day schools they attended.

Student body
In 1987 the school had 91 students. Some students lived in Rochester and Willmar. A total of 53 families enrolled their children that year.

References

External links 

 Official website in English
 Official website in Japanese

Asian-American culture in Minnesota
Minnesota
Education in Hennepin County, Minnesota
Schools in Minnesota
Richfield, Minnesota
Educational institutions established in 1978